Michel Cornelisse (born 24 December 1965 in Amsterdam) is a Dutch former cyclist.

Major results

1985
 2nd Omloop der Kempen
 3rd Ronde van Drenthe
1986
 1st Stage 5 Tour de Liège
 1st Stage 1 Vuelta a los Valles Mineros
 2nd Ronde van Drenthe
1987
 1st Ster van Zwolle
1988
 1st Driedaagse van West-Vlaanderen
 2nd Nationale Sluitingsprijs
1989
 1st Overall Tour de Luxembourg
1990
 2nd De Drie Zustersteden
1991
 1st Grote 1-MeiPrijs
 2nd Flèche Hesbignonne
 3rd Grand Prix Raymond Impanis
1992
 1st Stage 7 Tour of Sweden
 1st Stage 4 Tour Méditerranéen
 1st De Kustpijl
 2nd Nationale Sluitingsprijs
 3rd Scheldeprijs
1993
 1st Nokere Koerse
 1st Ster van Zwolle
 1st De Kustpijl
 2nd Driedaagse van West-Vlaanderen
1994
 2nd Nokere Koerse
 2nd Omloop van het Houtland
1995
 3rd Omloop van het Houtland
1996
 1st Grote 1-MeiPrijs
 1st Stage 4 Tour of Austria
 2nd Grand Prix de Denain
 3rd Nokere Koerse
1997
 1st Stages 1 & 2 Teleflex Tour
1998
 3rd Flèche Hesbignonne

References

1965 births
Living people
Dutch male cyclists
Cyclists from Amsterdam